Rapid Engineer Deployable Heavy Operational Repair Squadron Engineer (RED HORSE) squadrons are the United States Air Force's heavy-construction units.  Their combat engineering capabilities are similar to those of the U.S. Navy Seabees and U.S. Army heavy-construction organizations.

About
In the Vietnam War, Air Force "Prime BEEF" ("PRIMary Base Engineer Emergency Force") teams filled a need for short-term construction capabilities. However, the Air Force needed a stable and longer-term heavy-repair capability. The response was to organize two, 400-man (12 officers and 388 airmen) heavy-repair squadrons. RED HORSE units activated in 1966 when Secretary of Defense Robert McNamara asked the Air Force to develop its own combat construction team.

RED HORSE squadrons provide the Air Force with a highly mobile civil engineering response force to support contingency and special operations worldwide. Units are self-sufficient, 404-person mobile squadrons, capable of rapid response and independent operations in remote, high-threat environments worldwide. They provide heavy-repair capability and construction support when requirements exceed normal base civil engineer (Prime BEEF) capabilities and where U.S. Army engineer support is not readily available.

RED HORSE units possess weapons, vehicles/equipment and vehicle maintenance, food service, emergency management (CBRN passive defense and Counter-WMD operations), comptroller, contracting, supply and medical equipment and personnel.

RED HORSE's major wartime responsibility is to provide a highly mobile, rapidly deployable, civil engineering response force that is self-sufficient to perform heavy damage repair required for recovery of critical Air Force facilities and utility systems, and aircraft launch and recovery. In addition, it accomplishes engineer support for beddown of weapon systems required to initiate and sustain operations in an austere bare-base environment, including remote hostile locations, or locations in a chemical, biological, radiological, and nuclear (CBRN) -prone environment.

The primary RED HORSE tasking in peacetime is to train for contingency and wartime operations. It participates regularly in Joint Chiefs of Staff and major command exercises, military operations other than war, and civic action programs. RED HORSE performs training projects that assist base construction efforts while, at the same time, honing wartime skills.  Air Force RED HORSE units possess special capabilities, such as water-well drilling, explosive demolition, aircraft arresting system installation, quarry operations, concrete mobile operations, material testing, expedient facility erection, and concrete and asphalt paving.

To support the "Open the Airbase" mission, RED HORSE added an Airborne capability in 2003. With this capability, RED HORSE can rapidly deliver small specialized teams and equipment packages by airdrop or air insertion to conduct expedient airfield repairs. Initially, the only RED HORSE unit to have air-inserted troops was the 823rd RED HORSE, in April 2003 at Baghdad International Airport, however, the 554th established an Airborne capability known as the 554th RHS Assault, Assessment, and Repair Operations (AARO, pronounced “arrow”) team to provide an Airborne-inserted rapid airfield seizure and repair capability for the Pacific theater.

Units
There are four active-duty, 4 Air Force Reserve Command, and five Air National Guard RED HORSE squadrons:
554th RED HORSE Squadron, Andersen Air Force Base, Guam
819th RED HORSE Squadron, Malmstrom Air Force Base, Montana
820th RED HORSE Squadron, Nellis Air Force Base, Nevada
823rd RED HORSE Squadron, Hurlburt Field, Florida
Detachment 1, Tyndall AFB, Florida Also known as the Silver Flag Exercise Site.  The squadron's 84-person cadre provides contingency combat support training to Active-Duty, Air Force Reserve Command, Air National Guard, Army, Marine Corps, Navy and allied nations mission support group personnel. More than 6,000 people are trained each year at the site.

The 1st Expeditionary RED HORSE Group (inactivated) was in the USCENTCOM area of responsibility (AOR).  The 557th Expeditionary RED HORSE Squadron is now located in the USCENTCOM AOR, and is part of the 1st Expeditionary Civil Engineering Group that also consists of one Prime BEEF Squadrons and one RED HORSE Squadron.

Air Force Reserve:

307th RED HORSE Squadron, Barksdale Air Force Base, Louisiana (inactivated Aug 2015) 
555th RED HORSE Squadron, Nellis Air Force Base, Nevada (classic association with 820th RHS)
556th RED HORSE Squadron, Hurlburt Field, Florida (classic association with 823rd RHS)
560th RED HORSE Squadron, Charleston Air Force Base, South Carolina (active association with 628th Civil Engineer Squadron)
567th RED HORSE Squadron, Seymour Johnson Air Force Base, North Carolina (active association with 94th Civil Engineer Squadron)
583rd RED HORSE Squadron, Beale Air Force Base, California (inactivated Sep 2015; re-flagged as 940 CES)

Air National Guard:

200th RED HORSE Squadron, Camp Perry near Port Clinton, Ohio
Detachment, Mansfield, Ohio
201st RED HORSE Squadron, Fort Indiantown Gap, Pennsylvania
Detachment 1, Willow Grove, Pennsylvania
202nd RED HORSE Squadron, Camp Blanding, Florida (combines with the 203d RHF to form a full squadron)
203rd RED HORSE Squadron, Camp Pendleton, Virginia (combines with the 202nd RHS to form a full squadron)
210th RED HORSE Squadron, Kirtland Air Force Base, New Mexico under the HQ New Mexico Air National Guard
219th RED HORSE Squadron, Malmstrom Air Force Base, Montana (associate unit to the 819th RHS) 
254th RED HORSE Squadron, Andersen Air Force Base, Guam (associate unit to the 554th RHS)
254th RED HORSE Flight, Camp Murray, Washington
The Air National Guard squadrons are split units with separate commanders. When mobilized (excluding the 219th and 254th), these units come together as one squadron.

See also
Military engineer
Military engineering of the United States
United States Army Corps of Engineers
United States Navy Seabees

References

External links
Red Horse Association
819th RED HORSE Squadron
560th RED HORSE Squadron
The role of Air Force civil engineers in counterinsurgency operations

 

Construction and civil engineering companies of the United States
Engineering squadrons of the United States Air Force
Military engineering of the United States